Dendrocoelum is a genus of freshwater triclad. Over one hundred species have been described.<ref>Tyler S, Schilling S, Hooge M, and Bush LF (comp.) (2006-2012) Turbellarian taxonomic database. Version 1.7  Database </ref>

 Description 
The genus Dendrocoelum is characterized by the presence of a well-developed musculo-glandular organ known as an adenodactyl, which is also present in other genera of Dendrocoelidae. In Dendrocoelum, the adenodactyl is cone-shaped and has a distinct bulb, as well as a papilla, and its lumen receives the secretions of several glands.

 Species 
The following species belong to the genus Dendrocoelum:Dendrocoelum adenodactylosum Stanković & Komárek, 1927Dendrocoelum albidum Kenk, 1978Dendrocoelum amplum Harrath & Sluys, 2012Dendrocoelum banaticum Codreanu & Balcesco, 1967Dendrocoelum beauchampi Del Papa, 1952Dendrocoelum botosaneanui Del Papa, 1965Dendrocoelum caspicum Porfirjeva & Dyganova, 1973Dendrocoelum caucasicum Porfirjeva, 1958Dendrocoelum cavaticum Fries, 1874Dendrocoelum chappuisi De Beauchamp, 1932Dendrocoelum clujanum Codreanu, 1943Dendrocoelum coiffaiti De Beauchamp, 1956Dendrocoelum constrictum Harrath & Sluys, 2012Dendrocoelum duplum Harrath & Sluys, 2012Dendrocoelum hercynium Flössner, 1959Dendrocoelum italicum Vialli, 1937Dendrocoelum kenki De Beauchamp, 1937Dendrocoelum jablanicense Stanković & Komárek, 1927Dendrocoelum komareki Stanković, 1969Dendrocoelum lacteum Müller, 1774Dendrocoelum lacustre Stanković, 1938Dendrocoelum leporii Stocchino & Sluys, 2017Dendrocoelum longipenis Komarek, 1916Dendrocoelum maculatum Stanković & Komárek, 1927Dendrocoelum mariae Stocchino & Sluys, 2013Dendrocoelum minimum Kenk, 1978Dendrocoelum nausicaae Schmidt, 1861Dendrocoelum nuraghum Stocchino & Sluys, 2013Dendrocoelum obstinatum Stocchino & Sluys, 2017Dendrocoelum plesiophthalmum De Beauchamp, 1937Dendrocoelum polymorphum Codreanu & Balcesco, 1967Dendrocoelum puteale Kenk, 1930Dendrocoelum remyi De Beauchamp, 1926Dendrocoelum sanctinaumi Stanković & Komárek, 1927Dendrocoelum spatiosum Vila-Farré & Sluys, 2011Dendrocoelum stenophallus Codreanu & Balcesco, 1967Dendrocoelum subterraneum Komarek, 1919Dendrocoelum translucidum Kenk, 1978Dendrocoelum tubuliferum De Beauchamp, 1919Dendrocoelum tuzetae Gourbault, 1965Dendrocoelum vaillanti De Beauchamp, 1955Dendrocoelum vesiculosum'' Stocchino & Sluys, 2013

References 

Continenticola